Demolition is the fourteenth studio album by English heavy metal band Judas Priest, and the first in the decade of the 2000s. It is the second and final studio album to feature Tim "Ripper" Owens on vocals. It is also the only Judas Priest studio album to feature a Parental Advisory label on the album cover due to the songs "Machine Man", "Hell Is Home", and "Metal Messiah" containing profanity.

Background and reception
In 2018, Tim "Ripper" Owens pledged to re-record this album and its predecessor Jugulator as he feels that his era of the band has "been erased". Ever since Rob Halford rejoined the band, songs from both albums have been left off the band’s concert setlists, although Halford stated that he wouldn’t mind performing the songs live.

Guitarist Richie Faulkner cites "Hell Is Home" as his favourite song, "It's really heavy and the vocal melody is really great. I think Ripper sings it really well. It's probably one of my favorite Priest songs of the Ripper era. 'Hell Is Home' — I really like that."

Songwriting and production
The album was produced by guitarist Glenn Tipton, who also took over as the primary songwriter. The band's main songwriting team had long consisted of Rob Halford, K. K. Downing, and Tipton. After Halford departed, however, Downing and Tipton wrote all the songs on Jugulator. On this album, many of the songs were written solely by Tipton, with contributions from Downing on several songs. Former producer Chris Tsangarides, who cowrote "A Touch of Evil" on Painkiller, also assisted in the writing of a few songs. Drummer Scott Travis cowrote "Cyberface" – his only contribution to writing in the band's history. (Les Binks was Priest's only other drummer to cowrite a song.) This was the first album since Painkiller to feature a guest appearance by keyboardist Don Airey, who had played on "A Touch of Evil."

"People will wonder if a new Priest album is as good as any of the fifteen that came before it," Tipton acknowledged. "I'm confident they'll think this one is. It has some manic, hooligan tracks,
like 'Machine Man' and 'Bloodsuckers', as well as a typical 'Ripper' song in 'Jekyll and Hyde'.

The songs "Machine Man" and "Feed on Me" were included in Judas Priest's box set Metalogy.

Track listing

Personnel
Judas Priest
Tim "Ripper" Owens – vocals
K. K. Downing – guitars
Glenn Tipton – guitars
Ian Hill – bass
Scott Travis – drums

Additional musician
Don Airey – keyboards

Production
Produced and arranged by Glenn Tipton; co-produced by Sean Lynch
Mastered by Jon Astley
Front cover and booklet by L-Space Design
Back cover image by Benjamin Davies
Photography by Mick Hutson

Charts

References

Judas Priest albums
2001 albums
SPV/Steamhammer albums